Comerford, Commerford, Comberford or Quemerford is an Irish surname, of English origin. Notable people with the surname include:

People
Comerford
 Andy Comerford (born 1972), Irish hurling manager and player
 Ann Comerford, Irish camogie player
 Bella Comerford (born 1977), British professional triathlete
 Charles Comerford, American football player
 Cristeta Comerford (born 1962), Filipino-American chef who is the White House Executive Chef
 Eric Comerford (1912–1989), Australian rules footballer
 Evan Comerford (Dublin Gaelic footballer) (born 1998), Irish Gaelic footballer
 Evan Comerford (Tipperary Gaelic footballer) (born 1994), Irish Gaelic footballer
 Frank D. Comerford (1879–1929), American politician, judge, and author
 Frank D. Comerford (power official) (1875–1941), President of the Connecticut River Power Company and namesake of the Frank D. Comerford Dam
 Gerald Comerford (c.1558–1604), Irish barrister, judge and statesman
 Jane Comerford (born 1959), Australian singer
 Jim (James) Comerford (1913—2006), Australian trade unionist and writer
 John Comerford (1773–1832), Irish miniature painter
 Joseph Comerford (1958–2000), British engineer 
 Maire Comerford (1892–1982), Irish republican
 Martin Comerford (born 1978), Irish sportsperson
 Nicholas Comerford/Quemerford (c. 1554–1599), Irish Jesuit priest
 Phelim Comerford, Irish rugby league footballer
 Tommy Comerford (1933–2003), British organized crime figure
 Tony Comerford (1898–1970), American football and basketball coach
 Vincent Comerford, Irish professor of Irish history
 Frank Comerford Walker (1886–1959), United States political figure
Commerford
Kalindi Commerford (born 1994), Australian field hockey player
Shaun Commerford (born 1981), Zimbabwean cricketer
Thomas Commerford (1855–1920), American actor
Thomas Commerford Martin (1856–1924), American electrical engineer and editor.
Tim Commerford (born 1968), American musician

Locations

 Frank D. Comerford Airport, airport located in Walpole, New Hampshire
 Frank D. Comerford Dam, New Hampshire/Vermont border, United States
 Comerford House, the original location for the Galway City Museum
 Comerford Reservoir, on the Connecticut River
 Comerford Theater, historic movie theater in Pennsylvania

See also
 Quemerford, village in Wiltshire where the surname originated

English-language surnames
Surnames of Irish origin
Surnames of English origin
Toponymic surnames